This is a list of Australian films of the 1910s. For a complete alphabetical list, see :Category:Australian films.

1910s

See also
 1910 in Australia
 1911 in Australia
 1912 in Australia
 1913 in Australia
 1914 in Australia
 1915 in Australia
 1916 in Australia
 1917 in Australia
 1918 in Australia
 1919 in Australia

External links
 Australian film at the Internet Movie Database

 
 
1910s
Lists of 1910s films
Films